Josiah Lucky Mhlathe (born 16 February 1980) is a South African former professional football midfielder who spent his entire career at Jomo Cosmos.

References

South African soccer players
1980 births
Living people
Jomo Cosmos F.C. players
Association football midfielders